Morning's Tree-Lined Street is a 1936 Japanese drama film written and directed by Mikio Naruse.

Plot
Chiyo, a young country woman, moves to Tokyo, hoping that her friend Hisako, who allegedly works at a big company, will help her finding a job. As it turns out, Hisako works as a hostess in a shady bar in the Shiba district under the name of Shigeyo. Chiyo, reluctant to the idea to work as a hostess, tries to find a job in the city, but offers are scarce. While studying the newspaper, she learns of the double suicide of a business man, who stole money from his company, and his hostess. Hisako finds the idea of a double suicide of a loving couple romantic, but Chiyo disagrees.

Chiyo gets acquainted with Ogawa, a customer in the bar, who offers to help her with her job search. After repeated rejections, Chiyo finally starts working as a hostess, and gets drunk with Ogawa one evening. Later, they go on holiday together, visiting Chiyo's parents and residing in exclusive apartments. Although happily making plans for the future, Chiyo is irritated by Ogawa's erratic behaviour whenever he sees the police. Stopped by a police cordon, he drags Chiyo into the woods, confesses that he embezzled money from his company, and tries to talk her into committing suicide with him. Chiyo fends him off, finally waking up to find that her journey with Ogawa was a drunken dream. Ogawa visits Chiyo to tell her that he has been promoted and sent to Sendai, and gives her his new address in case she should feel like writing him. After he has left, Chiyo throws the note with his address into the water, determined to continue her job search.

Cast
 Sachiko Chiba as Chiyo
 Heihachirō Ōkawa as Ogawa
 Ranko Akagi as Hisako/Shigeyo
 Nijiko Kiyokawa as Fusako
 Satoko Date as Mitsuko
 Hatsuko Natsume as Fujiko
 Tamae Kiyokawa as Madame
 Masao Mishima as Madame's husband
 Kō Mihashi as Chiyo's father

Reception
Naruse biographer Catherine Russell calls Morning's Tree-Lined Street a "romantic fantasy", as it links Chiyo's dream, which Russell describes as "clearly a movie-influenced" one, to the romantic notion of travel.

References

External links
 

1936 films
1936 drama films
Japanese drama films
Japanese black-and-white films
Films directed by Mikio Naruse
1930s Japanese-language films